This is a list of companies based in Berkeley, California, current and former businesses either located in Berkeley or with their administrative offices there. Berkeley is the location of a number of nationally prominent businesses, many of which have been pioneers in their areas of operation.

Current

924 Gilman – founded in 1986; an all-ages, non-profit, collectively organized music club where Berkeley natives Operation Ivy, Pansy Division, Green Day, Rancid, Crimpshrine, Tiger Army and AFI started out
Aaron Marcus and Associates, Inc.
Acme Bread Company - one of the earliest artisanal bakers in the Bay Area
AlbertMing
Amoeba Music
Annie's Homegrown - natural/organic food manufacturer
Berkeley Bowl
Berkeley Electronic Press
Boner Records
BookFinder.com
Caffe Mediterraneum – Allen Ginsberg wrote part of "Howl" at "Caffe Med"
The Cheese Board – founded in 1967/71, this business comprises two collectively owned and operated businesses
Chez Panisse – founded in 1971 and the birthplace of California cuisine
The Claremont Resort – founded in 1906, this historic site was originally the Claremont Hotel. Although the main hotel building lies entirely within the city limits of adjacent Oakland, a portion of the grounds lie within Berkeley, and the resort uses this for its street address.
Cleis Press - feminist and woman-centered publishing company; moved from Minneapolis to San Francisco and is now located in Berkeley
Computers and Structures
Counterpoint - book publisher
DYMO Corporation
Earthmine
East Bay Vivarium

Fantasy Studios - recording studio founded by Saul Zaentz
The Freight and Salvage – founded in 1968, this is a nonprofit musical performance venue that primarily hosts folk music and world music acts
Game Revolution
The Good Bean
GU Energy Labs
Heyday Books - independent nonprofit publisher with a focus on California history, often partnering with organizations such as the Oakland Museum and Santa Clara University; founded by Berkeleyan Malcolm Margolin
LeadGenius
Magnatune
Magoosh - online education startup founded in 2009
Master-McNeil
Meyer Sound Laboratories
Middle-earth Enterprises
Monterey Market
Ninth Street Opus
Noah's Bagels
Nolo.com
North Atlantic Books
Pacific Steel
Peachpit
PowerBar
Publishers Group West

Rasputin Music
Revival Bar and Kitchen - bar and restaurant focused on food and drinks produced locally and sustainably
Rigetti Computing
Ronin Publishing
Small Press Distribution
Soft Skull Press
Stone Bridge Press
Ten Speed Press
Triple Rock Brewery and Alehouse
University of California Press
Wide Hive Records

Historic

Axcom Trading Advisors
Berkeley Farms
Berkeley Systems
Berkeley Tribe
Beserkley Records
Black Lizard - book publisher
Bookpeople - an alternative book wholesaler, responsible for much of the growth in alternative/small press book publishing from 1970-1990; moved to Oakland in the 1990s, closed in 2004
California Faience
Cetus Corporation
Clif Bar - headquarters formerly in Berkeley, moved to neighboring Emeryville
Cody's Books – founded in 1956 and closed in 2008,  was "a pioneer in bookselling, bringing the paperback revolution to Berkeley, fighting censorship, and providing a safe harbor from teargas for student activists during the Free Speech Movement and throughout the 1960s and 70s"
Consumers' Cooperative of Berkeley - the "Berkeley Co-op", a consumers' cooperative that operated from 1939 to 1988; at its height of popularity had over 100,000 members, making it the largest cooperative of its kind in North America

Cutter Laboratories - pharmaceutical company bought out by Bayer in the 1970s
Daliel's Bookstore
Ekso Bionics - moved to Richmond
ESS Technology - moved to Fremont
Fantasy Records - primarily now in Hollywood
Grey Rabbit - long-distance bus company; out of business in 1983
Hall-Scott - defunct engine manufacturer
Howell-North Books - publishers of railroadiana and history books
Image Comics - independent comic book publisher (moved to Portland, OR)
Lookout Records
Metalanguage Records
The Nature Company - former nationwide natural history and scientific general merchandise retailer
The Other Change of Hobbit – one of Berkeley's two science fiction and fantasy bookstores; first opened in 1977 (moved to El Cerrito)
Peet's Coffee & Tea - opened its first store in Berkeley, at Vine and Walnut Street, which is still operating; its corporate headquarters and roasting plant are now located in nearby Alameda
Rocknroll Blitzkrieg Records

Scharffen Berger Chocolate Maker -  now a subsidiary of The Hershey Company, closing the Berkeley factory in 2009
Shambhala Publications - now in Massachusetts
Whole Earth Access – founded in 1969 and closed in 1998; initially a countercultural retail store inspired by Stewart Brand's Whole Earth Catalog
Wilderness Press - moved to Alabama
Wind River Systems - moved to Alameda

Historic top employers
According to the City's 2009 Comprehensive Annual Financial Report, the top employers in the city for that year were:

Former employers of note include the State of California Health Department (900 in 1988, 600 in 2001), now the California Department of Public Health and the California Department of Health Care Services.

See also
List of companies based in the San Francisco Bay Area

References

 
Berkeley, California-related lists
Berkeley